Leslie Ferdinand "Buster" Narum (November 16, 1940 – May 17, 2004) was an American professional baseball player.

Born in Philadelphia, Narum graduated from high school in Clearwater, Florida. He signed with Baltimore at age 17 in 1958 and debuted with the Orioles early in the  season, finishing with no decisions in nine innings of work. The next year, he was sent to the Senators in the same trade that brought Lou Piniella to Baltimore. On May 3, 1963, Narum became the first-ever Oriole player to hit a home run in his first Major League at-bat, connecting off Don Mossi of the Detroit Tigers in an 8–5 Baltimore triumph.

Narum had a career batting average of .059 (7-for-118), though three of Narum's seven lifetime hits were home runs.

In 96 career games Narum compiled a 14–27 record, with 220 strikeouts, a 4.45 ERA, two shutouts, and nine complete games in 396 innings pitched. He allowed 398 hits and 177 bases on balls.

Buster Narum died in Clearwater at the age of 63.

See also
Home run in first Major League at-bat

References

External links

1940 births
2004 deaths
Aberdeen Pheasants players
Amarillo Gold Sox players
Ardmore Rosebuds players
Baltimore Orioles players
Baseball players from Philadelphia
Bluefield Orioles players
Buffalo Bisons (minor league) players
Fox Cities Foxes players
Hawaii Islanders players
Major League Baseball pitchers
Rochester Red Wings players
Tulsa Oilers (baseball) players
Victoria Rosebuds players
Washington Senators (1961–1971) players